The Choctawhatchee Formation is a geologic formation in Florida. It preserves fossils dating back to the Neogene period.

See also

 List of fossiliferous stratigraphic units in Florida

References
 

Geologic formations of Florida
Neogene Florida
Miocene Series of North America
Tortonian
Paleontology in Florida